Demba Chio  is a commune in the municipality of Quiçama, Luanda Province, Angola.

References

Communes in Luanda Province
Populated places in Luanda Province